Baba Umad Singh was a spiritual leader who lived in Rajasthan, India in the early 19th century. He is regarded as a local deity ("lok-devta").

Biography 

Baba Umad Singh was born in the village of Buhana, Jhunjhunu district, Rajasthan. His father was Gulji Singh. 

His shrine is in Maidee in the middle of Buhana tehsil, Jhunjhunu, Rajasthan.

According to local lore, Umad Singh was accepted by Madho Das of Jerpur Pali (Mahendragarh District, Haryana) as his Guru. Umad would visit his guru on foot each day and worked at his ashram during the night.

Madho Das eventually asked Umad to return to his own village, telling him that he would be revered as a deity there.

Philosophy
Baba Umad Singh believed in the equality of all human beings, be they high or low, rich or poor.

There is a temple in Buhana (Chhitri) dedicated to him.

Fair 
Each year a festival is held at Buhana (185 km from Jaipur and 35 km from Pilani) in memory of Baba Umad Singh. Thousands of devotees gather to pay homage during the annual event, which is held in the month of Jeth, on the first day of the dark half (Jeth Badi Ekam) of the moon. In the night The devotees organize cultural programs like jagran/bhajan sandhya (evening). The songs and bhajans that are played praise the life and history of Baba Umad Singh.

Photos of Mela Jagran 2011

References

Sources
 बाबा उमदसिंह का मेला भरा
 
 Rajasthan Patrika Private Limited Jhunjhunu Edition epaper dated Mon, 23 May 16
 Rajasthan Patrika Private Limited Jhunjhunu Edition epaper dated Sun, 22 May 16
 Clipping of Patrika Group - Jhunjhunu Edition
 Clipping of Patrika Group - Jhunjhunu Edition

External links 

 

People from Rajasthan
Indian Hindu saints
19th-century Hindu religious leaders